Ballykeeffe Wood is a national nature reserve of approximately  located in County Kilkenny, Ireland. It is managed by the Irish National Parks & Wildlife Service, part of the Department of Arts, Heritage and the Gaeltacht.

Features
Ballykeeffe Wood or Ballykeefe Wood was legally protected as a national nature reserve by the Irish government in 1980.

The woodland features an abundance of bluebells and brambles amongst pedunculate oak and young ash. The wood is adjacent to the old Ballykeeffe limestone mine, which was refurbished in the 1980s and now features rock climbing and an amphitheatre.

References

Geography of County Kilkenny
Forests and woodlands of the Republic of Ireland
Nature reserves in the Republic of Ireland
Tourist attractions in County Kilkenny